opened in Yonago, Tottori Prefecture, Japan in 2011. The three rooms of the exhibition hall display Yayoi decorated pottery, haniwa statues, fragments of early Buddhist wall painting from Kamiyodo Haiji, and a reconstruction of the temple kondō, with its paintings and sculptures.

See also
 List of Historic Sites of Japan (Tottori)
 Wall paintings of the Hōryū-ji kondō

References

External links
  Kamiyodo Hakuhō-no-Oka Exhibition Hall

Museums in Tottori Prefecture
Yonago, Tottori
History museums in Japan
Archaeological museums in Japan
Museums established in 2011
2011 establishments in Japan